The Black Phone is a 2021 American supernatural horror film directed by Scott Derrickson and written by Derrickson and C. Robert Cargill, who both produced with Jason Blum. It is an adaptation of the 2004 short story of the same name by Joe Hill. The film stars Mason Thames, Madeleine McGraw, Jeremy Davies, James Ransone, and Ethan Hawke. In the film, an abducted teenager (Thames) uses a mysterious telephone to communicate with the previous victims of his deranged captor (Hawke).

Derrickson came on board to direct The Black Phone after departing Marvel Studios' Doctor Strange in the Multiverse of Madness over creative differences. Filming occurred over two months in Wilmington and surrounding counties in the state of North Carolina. The film premiered at Fantastic Fest on September 25, 2021, and was theatrically released by Universal Pictures on June 24, 2022. A critical and commercial success, it grossed $161 million and received praise for its performances, faithfulness to the source-material, and screenplay.

Plot
In 1978, a serial child abductor and murderer nicknamed "The Grabber" prowls the streets of a Denver suburb. Siblings Finney and Gwen Blake live in the area with their abusive, alcoholic father. At school, Finney is frequently bullied and harassed. He has a friendship with a classmate, Robin, who fends off the bullies. A boy that Finney knew, Bruce, is abducted by the Grabber. Gwen, who has psychic dreams much like her late mother, dreams of Bruce's kidnapping. Detectives Wright and Miller interview Gwen at school, believing she has inside knowledge. She refuses to help, but is still punished by the siblings' father for speaking with the detectives. Shortly after, the Grabber abducts Robin.

Days later, the Grabber kidnaps Finney. He awakens in a soundproofed basement. On the wall is a disconnected black rotary phone. Later, Finney hears the phone ring and answers it. Bruce's ghost tells Finney about a floor tile he can remove to dig a tunnel to escape.

The police search for Finney is unsuccessful. The Grabber brings Finney food and leaves the door unlocked. Finney is tempted to sneak out. Billy, another boy on the phone, calls and explains this is a game that the Grabber plays. He is waiting to punish Finney if he leaves the basement. Billy instructs him to use a cord to get out via the basement window. His attempts break the bars on the window grate, preventing him from climbing back up. Gwen dreams of Billy being abducted and confides in her father.

Wright and Miller speak to an eccentric man called Max who is staying in the area with his brother. It is revealed Finney is in the clueless Max's basement, and the Grabber is his brother. Finney speaks to another victim, Griffin, on the phone. Griffin gives Finney the lock combination and informs him the Grabber is asleep upstairs. Finney sneaks upstairs and unlocks the door but the Grabber's dog alerts him of the escape. Finney is quickly recaptured.

Finney hears from another victim, a delinquent called Vance, whom Finney was scared of. Following Vance's instructions, Finney breaks a hole in the wall and enters the back of the freezer in the adjacent storage room, but the freezer door is locked tight. Finney hits his breaking point and begins to cry.  The phone rings one more time. Robin comforts Finney and encourages him to stand up and fight for himself. He teaches Finney to punch and to pack dirt inside the phone receiver to use as a weapon.

Gwen has a vision of the Grabber's house. She contacts Wright and Miller. Max realizes Finney is being held in the house and rushes to the basement to free him, only for his brother to kill him with an axe. The police rush to the house that Gwen found. In the basement, they find the buried bodies of the victims. Deciding it is time to end the game with Finney, the Grabber attacks him with the axe. Using the byproducts from his failed escape attempts, Finney immobilizes the Grabber. As the ghosts taunt the Grabber over the phone, Finney snaps his neck with the phone cord. 

Distracting the dog with meat from the freezer, Finney exits the house, which turns out to be across the street from the burial site. He reunites with Gwen. The siblings' father arrives and tearfully begs forgiveness for his earlier treatment of them. Back at school, a confident Finney sits next to his crush in class and says to her she can call him Finn.

Cast

 Mason Thames as Finney Blake, a young teenager captured by The Grabber
 Madeleine McGraw as Gwen, Finney's sister experiencing psychic dreams
 Ethan Hawke as The Grabber, a psychotic child kidnapper and serial killer
 Jeremy Davies as Terrence, Finney and Gwen's alcoholic and abusive widower father
 E. Roger Mitchell as Detective Wright
 Troy Rudeseal as Detective Miller
 James Ransone as Max, the Grabber's eccentric brother
 Miguel Cazarez Mora as Robin, Finney's friend who becomes a victim of the Grabber
 Brady Hepner as Vance Hopper, one of The Grabber’s victims 
 Tristan Pravong as Bruce, one of The Grabber’s victims
 Jacob Moran as Billy, one of The Grabber’s victims
 Banks Repeta as Griffin, one of The Grabber’s victims

Production

Scott Derrickson and frequent collaborator C. Robert Cargill decided to adapt Joe Hill's short story "The Black Phone" into a feature film while the former was working on Doctor Strange in the Multiverse of Madness, a sequel to Doctor Strange, which he had directed and co-written with Cargill. Cargill promised to postpone the project until Derrickson, who had a commitment with Marvel Studios, became available to direct. In January 2020, Derrickson came on board to helm The Black Phone soon after departing from the Doctor Strange sequel due to creative differences.

The Black Phone was officially announced in October, with child actors Mason Thames and Madeleine McGraw set to star. Thames said his audition took place over Zoom soon after the COVID-19 pandemic began: "It was quite weird and we had bad Wi-Fi. I'd say a line and it would take a few seconds for them to say something back. It got a bit awkward. Eventually I got a callback." In early 2021, Jeremy Davies, Ethan Hawke, and James Ransone were added to the cast. Hawke said he was initially hesitant on playing the villain because he did not want to be remembered for a "scary" performance for the rest of his career, but changed his mind after realizing he was in his 50s. "Villains might be my future," he added.

The film was shot on a $16–18 million budget. Principal photography began on February 9, 2021, and concluded on March 27. Filming took place at EUE/Screen Gems in Wilmington, North Carolina, and around the counties of New Hanover, Brunswick, and Columbus, under the working title Static. Mark Korven composed the score during post-production, and the film was completed by December 2021.

For the construction of the film, Derrickson was inspired by the films The 400 Blows (1959), The Devil's Backbone (2001), Rosemary’s Baby (1968), and the novel A Prayer for Owen Meany by John Irving.

Marketing

The marketing campaign from Universal Pictures for The Black Phone began with the release of a trailer on August 25, 2021, at CinemaCon. Variety said the film looked "scarier than the COVID-19 delta variant" and called it "the next possible franchise for Universal and Blumhouse." Screen Rant described the reactions to the trailer at CinemaCon as "intense". The film's poster was released on September 25, 2021. Screen Rant found it to be "terrifying" and said it would be "interesting to see if the film lives up to the hype". Collider said the mask in the poster evoked Lon Chaney's character from London After Midnight (1927). MovieWeb said the poster would "be behind your eyelids as you fall asleep tonight. ... we won't be able to see Ethan Hawke again without thinking of him as the terrifying and twisted Grabber. I've heard tell of his 'no villains rule', but clearly he's thrown that out the window." The trailer was released online on October 13, 2021. It was described by Vulture as a "stranger danger PSA". The A.V. Club said it looked like Hawke was "having a ball as the Pennywise-meets-Wonka child killer."

Release
The Black Phone was theatrically released in the United States by Universal Pictures on June 24, 2022. It was originally set for release on January 28 and later February 4 before being delayed again to June 24. The film had its world premiere at Fantastic Fest on September 25, 2021, closed the Overlook Film Festival on June 5, 2022, and screened at the Tribeca Festival on June 18, 2022. The film was released for VOD on July 14, 2022 and made available to stream through Peacock on August 12, 2022. The film was released on Blu-ray and DVD on August 16, 2022 by Universal Pictures Home Entertainment. As part of an 18-month deal, the film streamed on Peacock for four months, before going to Amazon Prime Video on December 27, 2022, before moving back to Peacock after ten months, where it will stream for a final four months.

Reception

Box office
The Black Phone grossed $90.1 million in the United States and Canada, and $71.3 million in other territories, for a worldwide total of $161.4 million.

The Black Phone was released alongside Elvis, and was projected to gross $15–20 million from 3,150 theaters in its opening weekend. The film made $10.2 million on its first day, including $3 million from Thursday night previews. It went on to make $23.6 million in its first three days, finishing fourth at the box office, and an additional $12.5 million from 45 international markets for a $35.8 million global debut. Women made up 51% of the audience during its opening, with those in the age range of 18–34 (its target audience) comprising 64% of ticket sales and those below 25 comprising 53%. The film then made $14.2 million over the four-day Independence Day weekend, finishing fifth.

Critical response
  Audiences polled by CinemaScore gave the film an average grade of "B+" on an A+ to F scale, while PostTrak gave the film an 86% overall positive score, with 67% saying they would definitely recommend it.

Screen Rant described the critical response as generally positive, with some criticism for the pacing and "number of scares" but praise for its faithfulness to the source material, Derrickson's direction, and Hawke's performance. Heidi Venable of CinemaBlend agreed, pointing out reviews complimenting the child actors, musical score, and screenplay, and wrote, "It sounds like this Joe Hill adaptation should please moviegoers, as long as audiences know they're in for something deeper than just tried-and-true jump scares."

Accolades

Potential sequel
In June 2022, Derrickson said that while Hill was protective of his story, the author had pitched him a "wonderful idea" for a sequel that he was open to directing if the first film was a success. In August, Derrickson and Hill confirmed that there were discussions with the studio to make a sequel. Derrickson referred to the financial success of The Black Phone as one of the catalysts for the development of the project. Hill said his inspiration to writing a sequel was based on the "iconic imagery" of the Grabber's masks.

References

External links
 
 

2021 films
2021 horror films
2020s American films
2020s English-language films
2020s ghost films
2020s serial killer films
2020s supernatural horror films
American ghost films
American serial killer films
American supernatural horror films
Blumhouse Productions films
Films about child abduction in the United States
Films about dreams
Films about psychic powers
Films about telephony
Films based on American short stories
Films directed by Scott Derrickson
Films produced by Jason Blum
Films scored by Mark Korven
Films set in basement
Films set in the 1970s
Films set in 1978
Films set in Denver
Films shot in North Carolina
Universal Pictures films
Works about telephones
Films postponed due to the COVID-19 pandemic